Christopher Tambling (13 May 1964 – 3 October 2015) was a British composer, organist and choirmaster. From 1997 to 2015 he was Director of Music at Downside School and organist and Choirmaster of the Schola Cantorum at Downside Abbey, leading the choir to international success.

Life
He received his musical education from Malcolm McKelvey at Christ's Hospital in Horsham, Sussex and at St Peter's College, Oxford. He later became the city organist and conductor of the Symphony Orchestra and Music Director of Glenalmond College in Perth, Scotland. His organ pupils have gone on to continuing success, including scholarships to Oxford and Cambridge.

Tambling died in Somerset in 2015 and was survived by his wife and two sons, both of whom are professional musicians.

Works
Tambling established himself as a composer and arranger of choral and organ works especially, well beyond the borders of his country. His compositions are often characterized by a romantic, expressive and an easy to get style. His main publisher in the UK was Kevin Mayhew and in German-speaking countries Dr. J. Butz. Tambling published books for students of various instruments, including a hugely successful 4 four-volume series, The Church Organist: A New Method, which, combining technical studies, improvisation, hymn-playing and a broad purview of repertoire, offers an approachable method to mastering the organ and has been lauded as a must-have for any aspiring organist. Tambling also wrote a number of pieces for children, including two children’s musicals with Michael Forster, which have been performed all over the world.

His works include, with the years indicating publication:
 Missa brevis in E flat for choir and organ (wind instruments ad lib.)(2017)
 Mass in A for choir and organ (strings ad lib.) (2015)
 Pastoralmesse for choir, orchestra and organ (2014)
 Missa brevis in B flat for choir and organ (2014)
 Messe in G for choir, orchestra and organ (2013)
 Missa Festiva for choir and organ (2013)
 Messe in A for one or two soprano choral voices, with organ and optional strings (2010)
 Festmesse in F for choir and organ (wind instruments ad lib.)
 Arrangement of Mass in B flat for choir and organ by Charles Villiers Stanford
 Arrangement of Missa brevis. Mass of St Gregory for SATB, organ and winds ad. lib. by Richard Runciman Terry
 British Album, ten pieces for organ (2009)
 Very British, eight pieces for organ (2013)
 Best of British, ten pieces for organ (2016)
 Six Pieces for flute (or oboe) and organ (2012)
 Ein Haus voll Glorie schauet, for choir, orchestra and organ, on the hymn "Ein Haus voll Glorie schauet", 2012 for the millennium of Bamberg Cathedral

References

External links 
 
 Christopher Tambling Butz-Verlag
 Christopher Tambling Kevin Mayhew

Alumni of St Peter's College, Oxford
People educated at Christ's Hospital
Classical composers of church music
British classical organists
21st-century classical composers
20th-century classical composers
Deaths from pancreatic cancer
1964 births
2015 deaths
20th-century British composers